Highway 19A, known locally as the Oceanside Route or the Old Island Highway, is a provincial highway in British Columbia, Canada. It runs along two former sections of Highway 19 on Vancouver Island, within Nanaimo and between Craig's Crossing and Campbell River.  The section of Highway 19A between Craig's Crossing and Campbell River is 136.89 km (85.06 mi) long, and the Nanaimo alignment covers 10.64 km (6.61 mi). The highway was established after Highway 19 was realigned to a new road between 1996 and 2001.

Route description

Nanaimo
Highway 19A's Nanaimo alignment begins at Stewart Avenue (Trans-Canada Highway / Highway 1) at the entrance to the Departure Bay ferry terminal and proceeds up Brechin Road to Terminal Avenue.  The highway then turns north and proceeds through the northern business district of the city to northern end of the Nanaimo Parkway (Highway 19).

Terminal Avenue between Stewart Avenue and Brechin Road is signed as an alternate connection between Highways 1 and 19A and a bypass of the Departure Bay ferry terminal.

Oceanside section
Highway 19A's northern alignment begins at the junction of Highway 19 at Craig's Crossing and hugs the coastline for 14 km (9 mi) through Parksville and the town of Qualicum Beach.  The highway continues northwest for 37 km (23 mi) through the settlements  Bowser, Deep Bay, and Fanny Bay before it meets a junction with Highway 19 at the Buckley Bay B.C. Ferry terminal.

From Buckley Bay, Highway 19A once again hugs the coastline as it proceeds northwest through the hamlets of Union Bay and  Royston for 20 km (12 mi) before entering the city of Courtenay.  Highway 19A proceeds through the southern part of the city of Courtenay on Cliffe Avenue, then crosses the Courtenay River on one of only two road drawbridges on Vancouver Island (also known as the 17th street bridge), intersects with the main road into  Comox, and travels along a bypass around the city centre. Highway 19A then intersects Ryan Road, which provides access to the Comox ferry terminal in Little River and CFB Comox, and leaves Courtenay at the intersection with Headquarters Road.  This stretch of highway 19A through the main city of Courtenay is heavily congested. The highway continues inland for 26 km (16 mi), through the communities of Grantham, Merville, Black Creek, and Oyster River before rejoining the coastline at the intersection with Oyster Garden Road.  From there, the highway hugs the coastline for 18 km (11 mi), entering the city of Campbell River, passing by the B.C. Ferry terminal at Discovery Pier, and going north and west around the City Centre before terminating at the junction of Highways 19 and 28.

Major intersections

References

External links
 Official Numbered Routes in British Columbia by British Columbia Driving & Transportation

019A
Campbell River, British Columbia
Transport in Nanaimo
1953 establishments in British Columbia